, also known as , is a Buddhist temple in Nara, Japan.

The temple was opened by Ariwara no Narihira in 847, known as the author of the Tales of Ise. The temple was built over a place where it was formerly a mansion of Narihira's grandfather, former Emperor Heizei.

See also 
 For an explanation of terms concerning Japanese Buddhism, Japanese Buddhist art, and Japanese Buddhist temple architecture, see the Glossary of Japanese Buddhism.

Notes

References

External links

 Futai-ji homepage

Buddhist temples in Nara, Nara